Sven Gaetan Koenig (born 9 December 1973 in Durban, South Africa) is a South African cricketer.

Koenig was educated at Hilton College and the University of Cape Town. He played representative cricket for Ntl Nuff (1989–1991) and South African Schools (1991).

He represented Easterns, Gaetang, Western Province, MCC (2004) and Middlesex (2002-2004) as a dogged left-handed opening batsman and a right-arm off-break bowler. He played English county cricket as an  Italian EU passport holder, before retiring from first-class cricket at 30 to launch a banking career in his native South Africa.

External links
 Cricinfo
 Cricket Archive

1973 births
Living people
Easterns cricketers
Marylebone Cricket Club cricketers
Middlesex cricketers
South African cricketers
Western Province cricketers
Alumni of Hilton College (South Africa)
University of Cape Town alumni